Synodontis rufigiensis is a species of upside-down catfish endemic to Tanzania where it is found in the Rufiji River basin.  This species grows to a length of  TL.

References

External links 

Rufigiensis
Freshwater fish of Africa
Fish of Tanzania
Endemic fauna of Tanzania
Fish described in 1968
Taxonomy articles created by Polbot